Twin Lakes is a pair of glacier-carved alpine lakes about  south of historic Leadville, Colorado. They are downstream along the Arkansas River, whose headwaters are by Leadville. The lakes, however, are on a tributary, Lake Creek, which joins the Arkansas just below the lakes. Both east and west lakes are recreation areas for boating and fishing.

Twin Lakes is also the name of an adjacent census-designated place (CDP) and a post office in and governed by Lake County, Colorado, United States. The Twin Lakes post office has the ZIP Code 81251. At the United States Census 2010, the population of the Twin Lakes CDP was 171, while the population of the 81251 ZIP Code Tabulation Area was 220 including adjacent areas.

History

Lake County, one of the original 17 counties created by the Colorado legislature in 1861, was named for the Twin Lakes. As originally defined, Lake County included a large portion of western Colorado to the south and west of its present boundaries. The Twin Lakes District has been listed on the National Register of Historic Places since 1974.

Geography

The CDP is bounded on the east by U.S. Route 24 (US 24), on the south by Colorado State Highway 82 (SH 82, and on the north and west by County Highway 24. The reservoir lies south of SH 82, outside the CDP. SH 82 leads west across Independence Pass  to Aspen, while US 24 leads north to Leadville and south  to Buena Vista.

Demographics

See also

 List of census-designated places in Colorado

References

External links

 Twin Lakes @ Colorado.com
 Twin Lakes @ Leadville.com
 Twin Lakes @ LeadvilleTwinLakes.com
 Twin Lakes @ TwinLakesCo.com
 Twin Lakes @ UncoverColorado.com
 Twin Lakes @ VisitTwinLakes.com
 Friends of Twin Lakes
 Twin Lakes Recreation Area
 Mount Elbert Pumped Hydroelectric Powerplant
 Lake County website

Lakes of Colorado
Reservoirs in Colorado
Census-designated places in Lake County, Colorado
Census-designated places in Colorado